La Carmélite is a 1902 comic opera, a comédie musicale in four acts and five scenes, by Reynaldo Hahn, to a libretto by Catulle Mendès. Hahn's second opera, like the first it was premiered at the Opéra-Comique.

Roles
Emma Calvé as Louise de La Vallière mistress of Louis XIV
Lucien Muratore as Louis XIV
Hector Dufranne as the Archbishop.

Recording
Théâtre du Capitole de Toulouse, Leo Hussain, Bru Zane recorded 2020, release ?.

References

Operas by Reynaldo Hahn
French-language operas
Opérettes
1902 operas
Operas